Eburella is a genus of beetles in the family Cerambycidae, containing the following species:

 Eburella longicollis Martins & Galileo, 1999
 Eburella pinima Martins, 1997
 Eburella pumicosa Monné & Martins, 1973

References

Eburiini